Thomas O'Hara (17 August 1952 – 27 January 2016) was a professional footballer who played as a midfielder. Active in Scotland and the United States, O'Hara made over 350 career league appearances. He also earned one international cap with the US national soccer team in 1982.

Early career
Born in Bellshill and raised in nearby Viewpark, in 1971 O'Hara moved to Celtic from Kirkintilloch Rob Roy (where he had been selected for Scotland at Junior level); however, like his elder brother Pat who had also been on the books at Celtic Park, he failed to progress from the reserves to play in any competitive senior matches in a period when the team was among the strongest in Europe.

Queen of the South
In 1974 O'Hara joined Queen of the South, the club to whom he gave his longest service. In subsequent interviews for the club, he was listed amongst the best players of that time by Allan Ball, Iain McChesney, Crawford Boyd and Jocky Dempster. O'Hara played in one of the more successful sides in the Willie Harkness era at Queens; they enjoyed some notable cup results as well as finishing runners-up in 1974–75 Scottish Division Two, being deprived of promotion to Scotland's top flight only by league reconstruction which meant only the winners of the lower tier moved up.

NASL
In March 1978, O'Hara moved to the United States where he signed with Washington Diplomats of the North American Soccer League. He spent three seasons with the club and amongst his teammates was Johan Cruyff.

Financial difficulties led the team to sell his contract in December 1980 to the Jacksonville Tea Men. He played one season in Jacksonville, then returned to Scotland.

Return to Scotland
O'Hara then played for Motherwell, Falkirk and Partick Thistle in the Scottish Football League. He later worked as a publican in Lanarkshire and Fife, having joined the industry while still playing football at a high level.

Death
Queen of the South, the club to whom O'Hara gave his longest service, were informed of his untimely death on 28 January 2016.

See also
List of United States men's international soccer players born outside the United States

References

1952 births
2016 deaths
Scottish footballers
Kirkintilloch Rob Roy F.C. players
Celtic F.C. players
Queen of the South F.C. players
Motherwell F.C. players
Falkirk F.C. players
Partick Thistle F.C. players
Washington Diplomats (NASL) players
Jacksonville Tea Men players
Scottish Football League players
North American Soccer League (1968–1984) players
United States men's international soccer players
American soccer players
Footballers from Bellshill
Association football midfielders
Scottish expatriate sportspeople in the United States
Expatriate soccer players in the United States
Scottish expatriate footballers
Scotland junior international footballers
Scottish Junior Football Association players
People educated at Our Lady's High School, Motherwell